Eat or Be Eaten is the seventeenth comedy album by the Firesign Theatre, released on Mercury Records in 1985.  Original Firesign Theatre member David Ossman did not appear on this album; Laura Quinn provided the voice of VJ Hawkmoth.

The CD includes images encoded in CD+G format.

Track listing
 Album:
 "Getting In" - 16:00
 "Getting Out" - 16:00

 CD:
 "Headball Classic" - 1:33
 "Wimpy's Software" - 1:51
 "Kamikaze Recall" - 0:53
 "Entering Labyrinth" - 1:16
 "Chi-Chi" - 0:19
 "Johnny Piano" - 2:32
 "The National Toilet" - 0:59
 "Welcome To Barberia" - 1:58
 "Shoplifters Market" - 1:05
 "Neighborhood Survival Gunstore" - 1:58
 "Getting In" - 1:39
 "Bait And Switch" - 2:46
 "Police Problems" - 2:28
 "Dylan At The Met" - 0:45
 "Art Snob" - 1:07
 "Eat Or Be Eaten" - 3:21
 "Tonto's Cowboy Bank" - 1:48
 "Getting Out" 3:33

References

External links
 
 Eat or Eaten Liner Notes

1985 albums
The Firesign Theatre albums
1980s comedy albums